Odbojkaški Klub Bosna is a volleyball club from Sarajevo, Bosnia and Herzegovina. The club was founded in 1947 and is part of the University Sport Society USD Bosna.  The club plays its games in a stadium in the Ilijaš part of town.

The Club used to play in the Yugoslav Volleyball League and today plays in the Premier League of Volleyball of Bosnia and Herzegovina.

The club's main sponsor is Eurohaus d.o.o. , a Sarajevo-based Brokerage House founded in 2002.

Honors
Yugoslav Volleyball Championship:
Winners (1): 1986–87
Volleyball Cup of Bosnia and Herzegovina:
Winners (1): 2005

Recent seasons
The recent season-by-season performance of the club:

Key

Notable players

  Miodrag Gvozdenović
  Radovan Malević
  Sanjin Bezdrob
  Haris Zolota
  Mirsad Imširović
  Milan Đurić
  Mirko Čulić
  Orhan Arslanagić
  Laslo Lukač

Coaching history

 Neven Kurešević
 Laslo Lukač
 Draško Stanišić
 Todor Piperkov (Bulgaria)
 Sun Szida (China)
 Petar Popović
 Senad Begić
 Jovan Vukalović
 Mirsad Imširović
 Miralem Turčalo
 Sabahudin Peljto

References

External links
USD Bosna

Sport in Sarajevo
Volleyball clubs established in 1947
Bosna